Assault weapons ban may refer to:

 Assault weapons legislation in the United States
 Assault Weapons Ban of 2013, an unsuccessful legislative bill from April 2013
 Federal Assault Weapons Ban, federal U.S. law of 1994
 Roberti-Roos Assault Weapons Control Act of 1989, California law regulating assault weapons

See also
 Overview of gun laws by nation